Preminchu is a 2001 Indian Telugu-language drama film directed by Boyina Subba Rao and produced by D. Rama Naidu. The film stars Laya and Sai Kiran with Roopa, Murali Mohan, and Lakshmi in supporting roles. The plot follows Meena (Laya), a blind girl who is abandoned by her mother (Lakshmi) and grows up to be an independent woman.

The film was showcased among the Indian panorama section at the 2001 International Film Festival of India. The film won five Nandi Awards.

Plot
Meena (Laya) is a college girl who was born blind. She is a confident and independent individual, and overcomes the hurdle of blindness. She lives like a normal person with the display of her extraordinary control over the other four senses. She meets Suresh (Sai Kiran) by an accident and their friendship starts growing. His impression for Meena increases when he knows that she is  blind.

Dolly (Roopa) is a cousin of Suresh. She is in deep love with him. Her father (Kota) encourages his daughter to marry very rich Suresh. Meena completes her studies by getting the state first rank. She takes up the profession of a lawyer.

Vasu (Murali Mohan), father of Meena, decides to marry his daughter to Suresh after coming to know their love story. When Vasu goes to Suresh's house with the marriage proposal, he realizes that the aunt of Suresh is none but his divorced wife Kousalya (Lakshmi).

In the flash-back, Vasu and Kousalya have differences when they realized that their baby girl is  blind. Vasu is in favor of accepting her and Kousalya wants to get rid of her daughter by keeping the baby in an orphanage. The couple get divorced and Vasu takes the baby and raises her to the present position. Rest of the film is about how Meena, in spite of being blind, takes on her mother Kousalya and gets the entire family united.

Cast
 Laya as Meena, confident blind girl
 Sai Kiran as Suresh, a rich man with kind heart
 Roopa as Dolly, Suresh's cousin
 Murali Mohan as Vasu, Meena's father
 Lakshmi as Kousalya, Meena's estranged mother
 Kota Srinivasa Rao as Dolly's father
 Rajitha

Soundtrack
 "24 Carat Golden Babu Na 24x36 Neede Babu" (Singers: S. P. Balasubrahmanyam and K. S. Chitra)
 "Hai Amma Hai Hai Amma" (Singers: S. P. Balasubrahmanyam and K. S. Chitra)
 "Kantene Amma Ani Ante Ela Karuninche Prati Devatha Amme Kada" (Lyrics: C. Narayana Reddy; Singers: S. P. Balasubrahmanyam and K. S. Chitra)
 "Maa Gundelalo Nindina Devatha" - S. P. Balasubrahmanyam,  K. S. Chithra 
 "Nooru Kotla Andhrula" (Singers: S. P. Balasubrahmanyam and K. S. Chitra)
 "Swagatham Yuva Premikulaku Swagatham" - S. P. Balasubrahmanyam, K. S. Chithra
 "Tolisari Ninu Choosi Preminchina Manasichinanamma Priyanestama" (Singers: S. P. Balasubrahmanyam and K. S. Chitra)

Awards and honours

References

External links
 

2001 films
2000s Telugu-language films
Films about blind people in India
Indian drama films
Suresh Productions films